Fai Huan is a Thai drama-revenge lakhon aired on BBTV Channel 7 in 120 minute episodes. The story is set in mid 20th century Thailand.

Synopsis
The first wife of a wealthy military officer has only one daughter (Mathana). A jealous and possessive woman, she orders her maid to kill her husband's second wife and to set fire to the house.
But the hapless second wife had just given birth and, against all odds, the baby is saved and brought up by the owner of a brothel.

When the baby (Bupha) grows up and becomes a beautiful young woman, she falls in love with a doctor, the same man that has been promised in marriage to Mathana, the daughter of the woman who had ordered her mother to be killed. Ruthless and determined she goes to work as a maid in the house of the high military officer. But the secret has been kept and they don't know that they are father and daughter. The vengeful spirit of his second wife appears to the military officer and prompts him to look for his lost daughter. Meanwhile, the girl makes powerful sorcery in order to get the doctor to fall in love with her.

Cast
Thanaphon Ninthyasuk (Tle Thanapol) - Doctor Ton
Thanyasuphang Chiraprichan - Mathana, daughter of first wife
Saemmi Khaowawen (Sammy) - Bupha, daughter of second wife
Pyathida Mitthirarot - First wife
Pharadi Yuphasuk - Owner of the brothel
Surawut Maikan - Military officer

See also
 Phi Tai Hong

References

External links
ไฟหวน Fai Huan Tser 1
CH7 - Fai Huan (Masquerade)

Thai television soap operas
2013 Thai television series debuts
2010s Thai television series
Channel 7 (Thailand) original programming